Cyrus Hobbi (born May 9, 1993) is an American football offensive lineman. He currently attends the University of Southern California. Hobbi is considered one of the best center prospects of his class.

A native of Scottsdale, Arizona, Hobbi attended Saguaro High School, where he was a three-time All-Region and two-time All-State lineman. In his senior year, he helped Saguaro win the Arizona state 4A-1 title and earned All-American honors by Parade, Super Prep, and Prep Star. Regarded as a four-star recruit by Rivals.com, Hobbi was ranked as the No. 4 offensive guard prospect in his class. ESPN.com gave him an 82-point grade and ranked him the No. 1 OG prospect. He chose to attend USC over Arizona State and UCLA.

After redshirting his initial year at USC, Hobbi was a backup center and offensive guard as a redshirt freshman in 2012. He appeared in seven games (Hawaii, Syracuse, Stanford, California, Utah, Colorado, Arizona) and even started at Stanford replacing an injured Khaled Holmes.

In 2020 he started to pursue acting and starred as Klein in the horror movie Blade: The Iron Cross, which is part of the Puppet Master franchise. In 2022, he starred in the Bowling for Soup music video for "Hello Anxiety", off their album Pop Drunk Snot Bread.

References

External links
USC Trojans bio

1993 births
Living people
Sportspeople from Arizona
American football offensive linemen
USC Trojans football players
American people of Iranian descent